Vicia ludoviciana, also known by its common name slender vetch is a species from the genus Vicia.

References

ludoviciana